Anis El-Rafei (Arabic: أنيس الرافعي) a Moroccan storyteller, was born in Casablanca in 1976. El-Rafei graduated from the Faculty of Letters and Human Sciences, specializing in linguistics and modern literary criticism. He is one of the most important short story hermits in Morocco and the Arab world. He remained faithful to writing the short story and did not leave it to write the novel, as many storytellers did.  Samples of his works have been translated into French, English, Spanish, Portuguese, Persian and Chinese, and he was chosen as one of seven distinguished writers to participate in the second cycle of the International Prize for Arabic Fiction, Arab Booker.

Biography 
The experience of Anis Al-Rafii, a Moroccan storyteller from the nineties, is a new experience based on working on the aesthetics of experimentation, which the writer considers not very pubescent, but rather a yearning and constant motivation. His creative project included working in parallel arts such as cinema, composition, photography, and music, which are closely related to his cognitive and emotional interests, which the writer invested in to create a new experience in the Arabic story.  Belgian- based Moroccan film director Ghobari El Hawari directed a short film inspired by the Dolls' clinic . He received the Gutenberg Prize and the Acciodi Prize. The stories of Anis Al-Rafei have been translated into many languages, and his works have received and continue to receive great attention and warmth from critics and specialists on the Moroccan and Arab levels. There are those who consider that Anis Al-Rafei, with his accumulated creative achievement, constitutes a real creative phenomenon in the field of the short story.

Dar Safsafa for Culture and Publishing chose to celebrate the storytelling experience of Anis Al-Rafai, by publishing eight books, in two parts, according to a special tab that included exercises, successions, notes, sounds, rituals, evidence, photograms and investigations. With the appendix of each part, the testimonies of Moroccan and Arab writers who accompanied the writer's experience by writing about it.

The Egyptian critic, Dr. Muhammad Al-Shahat, wrote on the back of the fourth cover of the book “The Tailor of Organizations”: “The narration of the book (The Tailor of Organizations) by the Moroccan storyteller Anis Al-Rafii operates on the principle of practicing creative writing as a (weaving) or (sewing) for a group of human bodies and situations, daily or cosmic. On the one hand, this (heterogeneous) book rises in its form and in its investigation of its cultural references, both Arab and Western, and woven with remarkable deliberation and patience, and whose quadrilateral geometric structure is formed in the form of a dress led by threads of questions and its compositions, drawing on the energy of ancient and medieval Arabic prose, paste with a modern narrative flavor”.

Writings 
He has published several collections of short stories, including:

 Scandals Above All Suspicion, 1999
 Things That Don't Happen, 2002
 Mr. Rebaja, 2004
 Parchment, 2006
 Tomato Can, 2007
 Butterfly weight on the roof of the bell, 2008 
 Arrest of the Forest in a Bottle, Dar Azmana, 2009 
 This is what will happen in the past, Spaces for Publishing and Distribution, 2010
 The Moroccan Company for the Relocation of the Dead, Supreme Council of Culture, 2011
 Areej Al-Bustan in the expenses of the blind - an imaginary story guide, Moroccan Arab House for Publishing and Printing, 2011 
 Dolls Clinic, about Dar Al-Ain, 2015
 Museum of the Disabled, about Dar Al-Ain, 2017
 Tailoring bodies, on the authority of Dar Al-Ain, 2018
 Alternative Spirits Repository, Khatwat Wa Zalal Publishing and Distribution House, 2020
 dread archipelago; Al-Mu’azal Storybook, Khatwat Publishing and Distribution House, 2020

References 

Moroccan writers
1976 births
Living people